Mulgedium is a genus of flowering plants in the dandelion tribe within the sunflower family.

Mulgedium is closely related to Lactuca and considered part of that genus by some authors.

 Species
Well over 100 names have been coined within Mulgedium, most of which are now considered better suited to other genera (Chaetoseris Cicerbita Crepis Lactuca Nabalus Paraprenanthes Prenanthes Stenoseris). The following remain in Mulgedium.
 Mulgedium cacaliaefolius DC. - Caucasus
 Mulgedium centrale Gand. - Illinois
 Mulgedium lindheimeri Gand. - Texas
 Mulgedium polyanthum Gand. - Kansas
 Mulgedium qinghaicum S.W.Liu & T.N.Ho - Qinghai
 Mulgedium roseum Popov & Vved. - Turkestan

References

Asteraceae genera
Cichorieae